

List of countries

References

Caribbean